Dawn E. Arnold is a Canadian politician, who was elected mayor of Moncton, New Brunswick in the 2016 municipal election. She is the city's first female mayor.

Prior to winning the mayoralty, Arnold served a term on Moncton City Council as a city councillor at large, and was the chair of the city's Frye Festival.

References

Mayors of Moncton
Moncton city councillors
Women mayors of places in New Brunswick
Living people
Year of birth missing (living people)